Mount Green is a  mountain summit located in Glacier National Park, in the Selkirk Mountains of British Columbia, Canada. The mountain was named by Arthur Oliver Wheeler for Rev. William Spotswood Green (1847–1919), who explored, mapped, named, climbed, and wrote about the Selkirk Mountains. His book "Among the Selkirk Glaciers", published in 1890, introduced the world to the Selkirk Mountains. He is credited with recommending the location for a small chalet to the Canadian Pacific Railway that would grow to become the Chateau Lake Louise hotel, as well as making the first ascent of Mount Bonney. The mountain's name was officially adopted September 8, 1932, when approved by the Geographical Names Board of Canada. The first ascent of the mountain was made August 25, 1910, by Alexander A. McCoubrey and Ernest Feuz who climbed the south ridge and descended the north ridge.

Climate

Based on the Köppen climate classification, Mount Green is located in a subarctic climate zone with cold, snowy winters, and mild summers. Temperatures can drop below −20 °C with wind chill factors  below −30 °C. Precipitation runoff from the mountain drains north into the Illecillewaet River.

See also

List of mountains of Canada
Geography of British Columbia

References

External links
 Weather: Mount Green

Green
Green
Green
Green
Kootenay Land District